Karamat Ali or Keramat Ali may refer to:

Karamat Ali Jaunpuri (1800–1873), Indian Islamic scholar
Karamat Ali (politician) (died 1951), Pakistani politician from Punjab
Md. Keramat Ali (1901–1969), Bengali politician from Sylhet
Mohammad Keramat Ali (1926–2004), former Bangladeshi Minister of Shipping
Karamat Ali Karamat (1936–2022), Indian Urdu poet
Keramat Ali Talukdar, Bangladeshi politician from Mymensingh
Kazi Keramat Ali (born 1954), former Bangladeshi State Minister of Education
Karamat Ali (cricketer) (born 1996), Pakistani first-class cricketer